is a railway station located in the city of Semboku, Akita Prefecture, Japan, operated by the third sector railway operator Akita Nairiku Jūkan Railway.

Lines
Sadōri Station is served by the Nariku Line, and is located 67.7 km from the terminus of the line at Takanosu Station.

Station layout
The station consists of one side platform serving a single bi-directional track. The station is unattended. There is no station building, but only a shelter built on the platform.

Adjacent stations

History
Sadōri Station opened on April 1, 1989 serving the village of Nishiki, Akita.

Surrounding area

External links

 Nairiku Railway Station information 

Railway stations in Japan opened in 1989
Railway stations in Akita Prefecture
Semboku, Akita